The county governor of Sør-Trøndelag county in Norway represented the central government administration in the county. The county of Søndre Trondhjems amt (re-named Sør-Trøndelag in 1919) was established by royal resolution on 24 September 1804 when the old Trondhjems amt was divided in two. The county existed until 1 January 2018 when the two counties were merged once again as Trøndelag county. The new county governor for Trøndelag will live and work in the town of Steinkjer.

The county governor is the government's representative in the county. The governor carries out the resolutions and guidelines of the Storting and government. This is done first by the county governor performing administrative tasks on behalf of the ministries. Secondly, the county governor also monitors the activities of the municipalities and is the appeal body for many types of municipal decisions.

List of county governors
The following is a list of the county governors of Sør-Trøndelag:

For the county governors of this area before 1804, see List of county governors of Trøndelag.
For the county governors of this area after 2017, see List of county governors of Trøndelag.

References

Sor-Trondelag